Financial security may refer to:

Financial security system
Economic security, the condition of having the resources to support a standard of living now and in the foreseeable future
Security (finance), a financial negotiable instrument

See also